The Lebanese Arab Struggle Movement – LASM (| Harakat al-Nidal al-Arabi al-Lubnani) or Mouvement de Lutte Arabe Libanaise (MLAL) in French, is a political party in Lebanon. Faisal Dawood, former Member of Parliament, is the current general secretary of the party. 

The LASM is supportive of the Syrian government and possesses a strong Arab identity.

See also
Cedar Revolution
March 8 Alliance
March 14 Alliance
Lebanese Civil War

References

Arab nationalism in Lebanon
Arab nationalist political parties
Political parties in Lebanon
Political parties with year of establishment missing
Politics of Lebanon